The 1892 United States presidential election in Illinois took place on November 8, 1892. All contemporary 44 states were part of the 1892 United States presidential election. State voters chose 24 electors to the Electoral College, which selected the president and vice president.

Illinois was won by the Democratic nominees, former President Grover Cleveland of New York and his running mate Adlai Stevenson I of Illinois. This marked the first time a Democratic candidate won Illinois since 1856 when James Buchanan carried the state. This makes the Prairie state one of three states (along with California and Wisconsin) that Cleveland lost in his first two electoral bids but won in his third.

Results

See also
 United States presidential elections in Illinois

Notes

References

Illinois
1892
1892 Illinois elections